= Herald on Sunday =

Herald on Sunday may refer to:

- Herald on Sunday, the Sunday publication of The New Zealand Herald
- Herald on Sunday, the Sunday publication of The Herald (based in Glasgow)
